Eddie or Eddy may refer to:

Science and technology
Eddy (fluid dynamics), the swirling of a fluid and the reverse current created when the fluid flows past an obstacle
Eddie (text editor), a text editor originally for BeOS and now ported to Linux and Mac OS X

Arts and entertainment
Eddie (film), a 1996 film about basketball starring Whoopi Goldberg
Eddie (soundtrack), the soundtrack to the film
Eddy (film), a 2015 Italian film
"Eddie" (Louie), a 2011 episode of the show Louie
Eddie (shipboard computer), in The Hitchhiker's Guide to the Galaxy
Eddy (Ed, Edd n Eddy), a character on Ed, Edd n Eddy
Eddie (mascot), the mascot for the British heavy metal band Iron Maiden
Eddie, an American Cinema Editors award for best editing
Eddie (book series), a book series by Viveca Lärn
Half of the musical duo Flo & Eddie
"Eddie", a song from the Rocky Horror Picture Show
"Eddie" (song), a 2022 song by the Red Hot Chili Peppers

Places

United States
Eddy, Alabama, an unincorporated community
Eddy, Illinois, an unincorporated community
Eddy, Indiana, an unincorporated community
Eddy, Oklahoma, an unincorporated community
Big Eddy, Kentucky, an unincorporated community
Eddy County, New Mexico
Eddy County, North Dakota
Mount Eddy, California
Eddy Creek (Kentucky), a stream
Eddy Creek (Lackawanna River), a stream in Pennsylvania

Elsewhere
Eddy Island, Nunavut, Canada
Island Eddy, in Galway Bay, Ireland
Eddy Col, Trinity Peninsula, Antarctica
Eddy Point, King George Island, Antarctica
Eddie (crater), a crater on Mars

People
Eddy (surname)
Eddie (given name)

Other uses
Eddy-class coastal tanker (1953), a former British Royal Fleet Auxiliary class
The Eddie or Quiksilver Big Wave Invitational in Memory of Eddie Aikau, a surfing tournament

See also
Eddy current, a phenomenon caused by a moving magnetic field intersecting a conductor or vice versa
Eddy covariance, a statistical method used in meteorology
Eddy Test, administered by the US Navy and Marine Corps during and after World War II
Edie (disambiguation)
Edy (disambiguation)